Eddie Ndukwu (born 1 June 1950) is a Nigerian amateur and professional bantam/super bantam/featherweight boxer of the 1960s, '70s and '80s who as an amateur won the gold medal at bantamweight in the Boxing at the 1966 British Empire and Commonwealth Games in Kingston, Jamaica, won the silver medal at featherweight at the 1973 All-Africa Games, won the featherweight class at the 1974 British Commonwealth Games, and represented Nigeria in the 1974 World Amateur Boxing Championships losing to eventual gold medal winner Howard Davis, Jr. of the United States.

References

External links

Article - The Death of Nigerian Sports And A Walk Down Memory Lane

1950 births
Bantamweight boxers
Featherweight boxers
Place of birth missing (living people)
Super-bantamweight boxers
Living people
Boxers at the 1966 British Empire and Commonwealth Games
Boxers at the 1970 British Commonwealth Games
Boxers at the 1974 British Commonwealth Games
Commonwealth Games gold medallists for Nigeria
Nigerian male boxers
Commonwealth Games medallists in boxing
African Games silver medalists for Nigeria
African Games medalists in boxing
Boxers at the 1973 All-Africa Games
Medallists at the 1966 British Empire and Commonwealth Games
Medallists at the 1974 British Commonwealth Games